Kung Hei Fat Choy is a 1985 Hong Kong comedy film produced, directed by and starring Dean Shek. The film co-stars Alan Tam and George Lam. Released to celebrate the Chinese New Year of 1985, the film's title is based on the greeting wishers give on the new year's first day.

Plot
Money God was being naughty in heaven and as a punishment, he was sent to Earth to do good deeds for humans. On Earth, he meets Fung, a restaurant owner and his son, Ben. Money God guides Fung to success and his business begins to rise while also helping him fend off loan shark Mo. At the same time, Money God tries to woo Fung's younger sister, Ellen. Later, Mo learns of the Money God and unsuccessfully tries to exploit him. As his popularity spreads across Hong Kong, cops, triads and ghost-busters start trailing the Money God.

Cast
Dean Shek as Mr. Fung
Alan Tam as Money God
George Lam as Mr. Mo
Siu Ban-ban as Ben
Michael Chan as Man
Ann Bridgewater as Ellen Fung
Yiu Yau-hung as Mr. Mo's younger brother
Cho Tat-wah as Superintendent of Police
Fung King-man as Loan Shark Ping / Pimp Lee
Karl Maka as Grabbing Gold (cameo)
Tsui Hark as Grabbing Gold (cameo)
Raymond Wong as Grabbing Gold (cameo)
Yat-boon Chai as Policeman
Yue Chi-ming
Yam Ho as Boo Shi
Foo Wang-tat as Professor Lam
Hui Ying-ying as Auntie Shun
Yu Mo-lin as Bride as mass wedding
Lau Leung-fat as Mental patient doctor
Shing Wan-on as Mr. Mo's thug
Shing Fuk-on as Mr. Mo's thug
Shing Fui-On
Kwan Chu-wa
Chan Chi-fai
Raymond Fung as Doctor
Ken Ng
Yeung Yau-cheung as Chuen
Steve Daw
George Hayes
Jonathan Watts
Martin Lee
Burton Kittan
Job Stewart 	  	 
Steve Smart 	  	 
John Nisbet 	  	 
Eric Lynch 	  	 
Bill Blair 	  	 
David Shaw 	  	 
Gerhard Baier 	  	 
Fung Gam-hung as Taxi Driver
Mok King-wah 	  	 
Fung Kam-hung 	  	 
Fei Pak 	  	 
Woo Wai-chung

Theme song
I Love the World (我愛世界)
Composer: Alvin Kwok
Lyricist: Raymond Wong
Singer: Alan Tam

Box office
The film grossed HK$18,418,994 at the Hong Kong box office during its theatrical run from 15 February to 5 March 1985 in Hong Kong

External links

Kung Hei Fat Choi at Hong Kong Cinemagic

1985 films
1980s fantasy comedy films
Hong Kong slapstick comedy films
1980s Cantonese-language films
Films directed by Dean Shek
Films set in Hong Kong
Films shot in Hong Kong
1985 comedy films
1980s Hong Kong films